Edward James Machell Lumb  (born 1863) was a British soldier and civil servant.

Early life
Lumb was born in 1863. He was the second son of Juliana-Georgina ( Harrison) Lumb (d. 1869) and James Lumb, High Sheriff of Cumberland in 1880. His elder brother, George Fitzmaurice Lumb, died aged 10. His younger brother was the Rev. Loftus Gerald William Lumb, a Clerk in holy orders. His two surviving sisters were Constance Harriet Elizabeth Lumb (wife of Robert Jefferson, Esq.) and Helen Juliana Lumb (wife of Maj. A. Lumb).

His father was the fourth son of Harriet ( Wilkin) Lumb and William Lumb of Brigham Hall, Cumberland.  His maternal grandfather was Joseph Harrison of Linethwaite Hall, Cumberland.

Career

Lumb served as a justice of the peace and Deputy Lieutenant of Cumberland. In 1903, he became a member of Lloyd's of London.

He served in the British Army, achieving the rank of Lieutenant-Colonel in the 2nd Life Guards under Sir Cecil Edward Bingham.

Personal life
On 16 September 1902, Lumb was married to the Hon. Catherine Elizabeth Ellen Horsley-Beresford (1870–1948) at the Church of St Michael le Belfrey, York. She was a younger daughter of William Horsley-Beresford, 3rd Baron Decies. They lived at 4 Hereford Gardens, Park Lane West and at Homewood, Whitehaven in Cumberland. In 1911, Lumb and Lord Camoys traveled to New York aboard the Mauretania to be ushers at the wedding of Lumb's brother-in-law, John Beresford, 5th Baron Decies, to the American heiress Helen Vivien Gould. At time, Lumb and Lord Camoys were reported to have "had nothing but flattering things to say of America and American women. Both said they were enthusiastically in favor of woman's suffrage."

His wife died on 11 March 1948.

References

External links

Medal card of Lumb, Edward James Machell Corps: County of London Yeomanry at The National Archives
Col. Edw. Lumb, Lord Camoys at the Library of Congress

1863 births
Year of death missing
British Life Guards officers
British Army personnel of World War I
Deputy Lieutenants of Cumberland